Laboratory sample tubes are used to hold small quantities of substances undergoing experimentation or testing. These tubes are usually made of glass, but can also be made of plastic or metal. They vary in size and purpose. Laboratory sample tubes must not be confused with glass tubing, which can be used to carry fluid between laboratory equipment.

Example laboratory sample tubes are listed below:

Ignition tube
Test tube
Boiling tube
NMR tube

See also
 Laboratory glassware

Laboratory equipment